Neron is a supervillain appearing in various American comic book stories published by DC Comics. He first appeared in Underworld Unleashed #1 (November 1995) and was created by Mark Waid and Howard Porter.

Neron made his first live appearance in the CW TV series Legends of Tomorrow, serving as the main antagonist of season 4 and being portrayed by Christian Keyes and Brandon Routh.

Publication history
Neron is a demon-lord of Hell and was first featured as the major antagonist in the DC Comics multi-title American comic book crossover event Underworld Unleashed released by DC Comics in 1995. After this introduction, he was next used in several storylines simultaneously: The Flash (vol. 2) #125–129 (May–September 1997), by Mark Waid and Brian Augustyn, Wonder Woman (vol. 2) #123–127 (July–November 1997) by John Byrne and a two-part story in JLA #6–7 (June–July 1997) by Grant Morrison, with art by Neron's co-creator Howard Porter. The last storyline was concluded in the three-issue miniseries JLA: Paradise Lost (January–March 1998).

Neron next appeared in New Year's Evil: The Rogues #1 (February 1998), a part of the DC Comics storyline "New Year's Evil" that ran in eight one-shot issues, followed by "Infernal Villains: Etrigan Meets Neron", a two-page vignette featuring the first meeting of Neron and Etrigan the Demon in the one-shot anthology issue DCU Villains Secret Files and Origins #1 (April 1999) and ended the year with a part in the five-issue weekly series Day of Judgement (November 1999) and a stand-alone tale by J.M. DeMatteis, "Heart of Hell" in Superman: The Man of Tomorrow #15 (fall 1999), the last issue of that series, which is part of the Day of Judgement crossover storyline and the first of two issues published after the storyline was over that concludes it.

His next appearances were in the five-issue weekly series Deadman: Dead Again (October 2001) written by Steve Vance, a humorous Christmas story called "Merry Christmas, Justice League – Now Die!" in JLA #60 (January 2002) and a brief encounter in "On Duty In Hell" in Human Defense Corps #6 (December 2003), the last issue of the six-issue miniseries. Two years later, he was featured in the last four parts of the six-part storyline "Out of the Past" in Richard Dragon #7–12 (January–June 2005), then during the DC crossover event 52, Neron was involved in Week 25 (October 25, 2006) and Week 42 (February 21, 2007), followed by "Devil May Care" in Teen Titans (vol. 3) #42 (February 2007). Keith Giffen penned an eight-issue miniseries Reign in Hell (September 2008–April 2009, including DC Universe Special: Reign in Hell #1 (August 2008)) featuring an all-out war between Hell and Purgatory. Since then, there have been three further appearances, a short joke involving Ambush Bug (Irwin Schwab) in issue #3 of the six-issue miniseries Ambush Bug: Year None #1–5 and 7 (September 2008–January 2009 and December 2009), and two canonical appearances, the first in issues #8–13 of the 13-issue miniseries Constantine: The Hellblazer (August 2015–August 2016) and the second in issues #2–6 of the six-issue miniseries Midnighter and Apollo (December 2016–May 2017).

Fictional character history
Neron is one of the major demon-lords of Hell, a "Wishweaver", the "King of Hate" and the "Lord of Lies". It is not known how old he is, but he has claimed "I brought the very first couple together" and he has told Wonder Woman "I am among the first that walked abroad in this universe, and my influence has been known since humanity's first fall from grace". Although he is unknown to Earth's superheroes and supervillains until the events of Underworld Unleashed, the ancient supervillain Vandal Savage (Vandar Adg II) is long since acquainted with him.

He specializes in making deals with people for their souls in exchange for fulfilling their greatest desires. As Vandal Savage says to him: "Deals are your passion, Neron. You grant us the desires of our hearts – in exchange for our immortal souls". These deals are classic Faustian arrangements made only to further his own twisted ends; half-truths and treachery which lead to either misfortune for the dealmakers or their deaths, the latter either as a result of their own actions or by Neron claiming their souls when the deal is up or when they fail to keep their side of the deal. In other cases, he achieves his aims by offering similarly treacherous information or by fulfilling a person's greatest desire in exchange for the completion of a task for him – usually with similar results. To approach a victim, he will either appear before them directly with a deal for their soul or send them a carved black candle (a "demon stick" forged in demon's blood) which, when lit, either summons him to them directly to make a deal or brings them to Hell, where they then meet him and are offered a deal.

Neron appears to be unable to resist a chance to make a deal; he is attracted to deal-making to corrupt and gain souls. He is also attracted to purity and wishes to corrupt and destroy it wherever he finds it. Both of these attractions have led to his defeat many times.

Underworld Unleashed

Neron's first appearance to Earth's supervillains and superheroes occurs during the Underworld Unleashed crossover event, when he plots to take over Earth by fulfilling the greatest desires of dozens of supervillains and superheroes in exchange for their souls. When attempting to tempt Green Lantern V (Kyle Rayner), he offers to bring back from the dead Rayner's girlfriend, Alexandra deWitt; similarly he offers to bring Robin II (Jason Peter Todd) back from the dead for the Batman and to bring the Flash II (Bartholomew Henry "Barry" Allen) back from the dead for the Flash III (Wallace Rudolph "Wally" West II).

He tricks five members of the Flash's Rogues Gallery (Captain Boomerang, Captain Cold, Heat Wave, the Mirror Master III (Evan McCulloch) and the Weather Wizard) into causing a series of explosions in five separate places that kills all of them in green fire. When seen from the sky, the flames from the five explosions resemble the points of a pentagram and the symbol, combined with the deaths of the five Rogues Gallery members, creates a gateway which enables Neron to travel to Earth and to corrupt humanity. Many supervillains and superheroes are either approached directly with deals for their souls or sent carved black candles which, when lit, either summon Neron to them directly for them to make a deal or bring them to Hell, where they then meet him and are offered a deal. About 50 supervillains have their greatest desires fulfilled as a result.

Ultimately, Neron is scheming to take over Earth and to obtain a "pure soul" that he can corrupt. Initially, everyone assumes that this refers to Superman's soul, but he actually seeks the soul of Captain Marvel. In the end, he is defeated by the Trickster (Giovanni Giuseppe a.k.a. James Montgomery Jesse) and the most powerful members of Justice League America, including Captain Marvel, though not before causing mass chaos and worldwide destruction, killing the alien tyrant Mongul I with his bare hands and sending away unharmed a large number of supervillains who had rejected his offer. Captain Marvel makes a deal with Neron to release Earth and all of his fellow superheroes in exchange for his soul and nothing else. Neron accepts and tries to take Captain Marvel's soul, but as the deal was made for purely selfless reasons, the soul is too pure for him to touch; Neron, however, still had to honor his side of the deal by his very nature, and rejecting the deal led to the undoing of most of his other deals (although a few villains would retain their enhanced powers and details such as the death of Blue Devil's friend Marla remained despite the deals ending).

"Hell to Pay" and afterward
Two years later, the five Rogues Gallery members that were previously killed by Neron's treachery are resurrected from the dead as soulless killers to cause havoc in Keystone City (along with Major Disaster, who has become Neron's latest lieutenant), causing the Flash III to challenge Neron for their souls after gaining an audience in Hell by using a candle that former Rogues Gallery member the Pied Piper had kept but never lit, all of which Neron had supposedly planned. Neron offers the Flash III a deal for the Rogues Gallery members' souls, but he refuses and is allowed to leave Hell with the original Flash (Jay Garrick), whom Neron had captured earlier. Knowing that the now almost-immortal Rogues Gallery members will soon be too powerful for anyone to fight, Neron's plan is that the Flash III will be forced to make a deal with him to save Keystone City. Neron refuses the offer for the Flash III's soul and asks for his love for news reporter Linda Park instead because of its purity. He gets it, and Linda's soul also, which she had made a deal for earlier in exchange for Neron not going after the Flash III's soul. Neron had planned all of this to use the Speed Force to both enter into, and to rule, Heaven, but the plan backfires and the essence of the Flash III and Linda's love corrupts him, causing him to feel pity and compassion for the damned souls in his realm for the first time in his existence without understanding why and forcing him in utter desperation to frantically offer the couple another deal to take their love back. The Flash III accepts the deal, in return asking Neron to truly bring the Rogues Gallery members back from the dead and return their souls to their bodies – which Neron does, afterwards vowing revenge on the Flash III for defeating him before disappearing.

Immediately after this, he captures Wonder Woman and Artemis of Bana-Mighdall in Hell as part of a plan to bring about the defeat of his enemy, Etrigan the Demon. After being seriously hurt by Artemis in the ensuing battle, he kills Wonder Woman, although she is later restored to life by the Olympian Gods.

JLA: Paradise Lost and afterward
Next, Neron's ambitions to conquer Heaven are furthered when he notices chaos and "strife between the orders of angels" when Asmodel, a renegade King-Angel of the Bull Host who has waited 1,000,000 years to rebel against Heaven, and Zauriel, an angel who knows his secret, use Earth as their battlefield. Asmodel makes a deal with Neron to have him help him in his plans to take over Heaven, but at the last moment of the assault on Heaven, Neron abandons his support for unknown reasons and returns to Hell without any explanation as to why.

Immediately after this, he is once again defeated by the Trickster with the help of the five Rogues Gallery members whom he had been involved with twice before, the Pied Piper and Billy Hong, a 12-year-old boy who is also the Majee, a special agent of the Saravistran god Mestra sent to observe and weigh humanity's progress. As part of the deal that he makes with the demon, the Trickster orders Neron to forever forget all about the five Rogues Gallery members altogether, with the only thing that he asks for in exchange is to be always remembered as the one mortal who beat Neron at his own game...twice. The enraged Neron informs the Trickster in no uncertain terms that he will remember this moment before disappearing and all five of the Rogues Gallery members are, as a result, grudgingly grateful to the Trickster for being freed from Neron's revenge forever. Minutes later, the Trickster is flabbergasted to be told that Billy Hong is his son through his relationship with his then-girlfriend Mindy Hong.

Day of Judgment and afterward

Etrigan the Demon (who is trying to cause chaos on Earth and defeat his enemy, Neron) causes trouble in Neron's realm by bonding Asmodel (who is bound in Hell and being tortured by Neron) to the Spectre-Force (which is awaiting a new host after its previous host James Brendan "Jim" Corrigan's death and ascension into Heaven) with the ashes of an angel's wing feather. Asmodel, who is trying to destroy both Heaven and Hell, uses the Spectre's powers to extinguish the hellfire font, causing Hell to freeze over. In the chaos caused by the inhabitants of all of Hell's realms invading Earth, Neron uses Superman's body as a gateway to Earth and once again tries to claim the Spectre-Force for himself. He is defeated when the Spectre-Force chooses Harold "Hal" Jordan (the former Green Lantern II) as its new host instead over both him and Asmodel (thus making Hal Jordan into the Spectre for a time) and then he is punished by his fellow demon-lords for using Hell's power for his own pleasure. His royal status is stripped from him and he is demoted to the position of a Rhyming Demon – which had been Etrigan the Demon's plan all along. Later, it is revealed that Superman was not just used as a gateway to Earth, but was actually replaced by Neron in disguise while Superman's soul was battling for Lois Joanne Lane's soul in Hell.

To win back his position in Hell and regain his full powers, Neron next travels back into the past three times to collect three previously-dead superheroes' souls at the time of their deaths: Barry Allen (who had died in the Crisis), Jason Todd (who had been killed by the Joker) and Superman (who had been killed by Doomsday). However, he only gains the first two souls, even though he ultimately needs three souls to accomplish his goal. Unable to enter Superman's body himself because of its purity, he discovers that his human surrogate, Darius Caldera, is rejected by Superman's body also, so he makes a deal with Caldera and uses his soul as the third of the three souls that he requires. He then turns his attention to Green Lantern II, tricking Deadman into saving Hal Jordan from death in the past during his battle with Mongul, ensuring that Neron will have the chance to tempt Jordan later in his history (after he has become Parallax II) and thus succeed in winning back his position in Hell and regaining his full powers. Neron erases Deadman's memory of him so that he cannot prevent this from happening, but is finally defeated when the Spectre (the Spectre-Force being still bonded to Hal Jordan at this time) restores Deadman's memory and Deadman changes the future by ensuring that Caldera dies before Neron can even offer him a deal.

Despite this setback, Neron regains his full powers, after which the demon Calcabrina offers Neron the souls of 66 members of the Human Defense Corps in an attempt to deflect both the Corps and other Earthly forces from a war with him. Two years after this, he tries to make a deal with Richard Dragon, Kung Fu Fighter, but fails to do so.

52 and afterward

Under thrall to Neron, Felix Faust plots to deliver him the Elongated Man's (Randolph William "Ralph" Dibny) soul at the moment of its greatest despair. Pretending to be Doctor Fate, Faust attempts to convince the Elongated Man that he can resurrect his wife, Susan Dearbon "Sue" Dibny, from the dead and teaches him magical skills so that he can do so, but is tricked by the Elongated Man, who has known for some time that he is not Doctor Fate and that Neron is responsible for the whole plot. When Neron appears, he is goaded by the Elongated Man into killing him, but then discovers too late that the Elongated Man has tricked him and has established a circle of binding around Doctor Fate's home, the Tower of Nabu, which can only be undone by the person who originally created it. Neron is thus trapped in the tower with Faust.

The binding does not last; Neron escapes from the tower and makes a deal with Kid Devil, granting him the superpowers that he has always dreamed of having by turning him into Red Devil in exchange for his soul when he reaches 20 years of age, and if his trust in his idol, Blue Devil, is broken. He then reveals that Blue Devil was responsible for the death of Red Devil's aunt, filmmaker Marla Bloom, and had hidden the truth from him. When Red Devil confronts Blue Devil, he finds out that everything that Neron had said was the truth and he becomes estranged from Blue Devil for a time, believing, at that moment, that his soul now belongs to Neron.

Reign in Hell

Neron is next opposed by the demon siblings Blaze and Satanus, the rulers of Purgatory, who attempt to take control of Hell while he is imprisoned in the Tower of Nabu. The hordes of Purgatory invade Hell under their command and influence Hell's demons against Neron by offering "hope to the hopeless" and redemption for the damned, which had never happened before. To defeat the legions of the damned, Neron has Lilith the Mother of Monsters recall all of her monstrous children to Hell to fight on his side. Despite all of this and just when Neron seems to be victorious, he is killed by Satanus, who had used the war as a cover to infect Hell with a modified airborne viral variation of DMN, a magical drug that normally changes humans into monsters but, in this variation, changes demons into soulless humans when combined with the speaking of the magic word "Shazam". For Neron, the drug turns him into a soulless human as well and causes all of the demonic entities that he had consumed over the millennia to be cast out of him. No longer a match for Satanus, he is beheaded by his former enemy, after which Satanus claims the throne of Hell for himself. Blaze, Satanus' sister, soon usurps her brother's position and claims the throne for herself, thus winning the war.

Ambush Bug: Year None

Ambush Bug goes to Hell and asks Neron to nullify his marriage to the Dumb Bunny, one of the members of the Inferior Five (whom he married in Las Vegas while he was drunk) – one of several alternate realities that he visits to find a way to get out of the marriage.

The New 52

In 2011, DC relaunched all of its titles in an initiative called The New 52. Neron's first appearance in The New 52 version of the DC Universe (as part of the DC YOU line) was in Constantine: The Hellblazer #8–13 (March–August 2016). In this story, Neron is retconned as originally having been a minor demon who, through various unscrupulous means, became the demon-lord that he is today in the 1980s. The Underworld Unleashed crossover event is also revealed in this story as being canon in this version of the DC Universe and is said to have occurred in the 1990s. Here, he becomes an enemy of John Constantine the Hellblazer. He is also drawn in this story as a satirical caricature of Donald Trump.

DC Rebirth

In 2016, DC's titles were relaunched again in another initiative called DC Rebirth. Neron's first appearance in the DC Rebirth version of the DC Universe was in Midnighter and Apollo #2–6 (January–May 2017). In this story, Neron is keeping Apollo (one half of the superhero team Midnighter and Apollo) as a prisoner in Hell and Midnighter tries to free him from Neron's clutches, ultimately succeeding in doing so, but not without a fierce struggle on both sides of the battle.

Powers and abilities
Neron is normally portrayed as being one of the most powerful magical beings in the DC Universe; almost invulnerable and able to do many incredible feats such as warping reality and resurrecting mortal beings from the dead. However, despite manifesting great strength and immense magical power on occasion, he normally relies on a deal to obtain human souls and only claims them when the deal is up or when his victims fail to keep their side of the deal. He is able to give superheroes and supervillains magic-based powers, he can greatly enhance a superhero or supervillain's existing powers, and he has the ability to assume a human-like appearance. He possesses immense physical strength, killing Mongul with his bare hands. He is also adept at creating items of power, for example, the Ocean Master's trident, or more common items such as the Secret Six III's Get Out of Hell Free card or a box of Cuban cigars for the Joker. If he is killed, he returns to his own realm.

In other media

Television
Neron made his live action debut in season 4 of the CW TV series Legends of Tomorrow, portrayed by Christian Keyes in the body of Desmond and by Brandon Routh in the body of Ray Palmer. John Constantine revealed that Neron approached him with the deed to his soul, looking for help in taking over Hell. However, when Constantine refused, Neron made a deal with his lover Desmond, who agreed to bind his soul to Neron's to protect Constantine. When Constantine sent Neron back to Hell, he was also forced to damn his lover to it. Inhabiting Desmond's body, Neron caused trouble for the Legends through his partnership with Time Bureau funder Hank Heywood. When Hank had a change of heart about their plan and tried to back out of it, Neron killed him and eventually took Legends member Ray Palmer as his new host. Palmer surrendered his body when Neron promised not to kill his teammate Nate Heywood. Forcing Constantine to help him, Neron opened a portal to Hell and brought his lover Tabitha the Fairy Godmother to Earth, with the two looking to open a larger portal that would unleash all of Hell on Earth. Constantine and Nate tricked Neron into breaking his word by killing Nate, which ejected him out of Ray's body. Neron in his shadow-form was finally killed by Constantine, though the team resurrected Nate shortly thereafter.

References

External links
 DCU Guide: Neron

Characters created by Mark Waid
Comics characters introduced in 1995
DC Comics characters who are shapeshifters 
DC Comics characters who can move at superhuman speeds
DC Comics characters who use magic
DC Comics characters with superhuman strength
DC Comics demons
DC Comics male supervillains
DC Comics characters who have mental powers
DC Comics telekinetics 
DC Comics telepaths
Fictional characters who can manipulate reality 
Fictional characters with death or rebirth abilities
Fictional mass murderers
Fictional soul collectors